The Aceh rat (Rattus blangorum) is a species of rodent from the family Muridae. The Aceh rat is listed as Data Deficient on the IUCN Red List because only two specimens have ever been recorded, and little is known about the species. The species was first regarded as its own species and then as a subspecies of the Malayan field rat (Rattus tiomanicus), but was once again considered distinct due to its small body size.

It is believed that the Aceh rat prefers lowland forests.

See also 
 Malayan field rat

References 

Rattus
Mammals described in 1942